Abajo Peak is the highest peak in the Abajo Mountains of southeast Utah, United States and is located in the Manti-La Sal National Forest. There are several communication towers on the peak.

References

External links

 

Mountains of Utah
Mountains of San Juan County, Utah